Olivet is an unincorporated rural community in Wellington North Township, Wellington County, Ontario, Canada.

A post office was located in Olivet from 1886 to 1915.

Olivet was located in Arthur Township until 1999, when Arthur was amalgamated into Wellington North.

References

Communities in Wellington County, Ontario